Jandali may refer to:
 Jandali language, an Australian language
 Jandali, a Syrian surname; notable people include:
 Abdulfattah Jandali, father of Steve Jobs
 Malek Jandali, pianist and composer
 Mona Jandali, novelist